Alfonso De Lucia (born 12 November 1983) is an Italian football coach and a former player who played as a goalkeeper.

Career

Parma
De Lucia was signed by Parma A.C. from S.S.C. Napoli, as part of the deal of Paolo Cannavaro.

De Lucia made his professional debut as a replacement for injured Cláudio Taffarel during a Serie A league game versus AC Milan on 30 March 2002, at the age of 18. The following season De Lucia did not make any appearance, being later loaned out to Serie B side Salernitana for the 2003–04 season. After his return to Parma in July 2004, he served as a reserve for veteran keeper Luca Bucci, also managing to play 17 more games in three seasons.

Livorno
On 13 July 2007 De Lucia moved to Livorno. He played the 2007–08 season again as a reserve, this time behind Italian international Marco Amelia. After Livorno's relegation to Serie B which persuaded Amelia to leave the club, De Lucia was promoted as first-choice goalkeeper, and served as a regular in the 2008–09 campaign that ended in a prompt return to the top flight as playoff winners. In 2009–10 Livorno signed Francesco Benussi and Rubinho as a backups for De Lucia. They played 16 games in Serie A.

De Lucia became the backup of Francesco Bardi in 2011–12 Serie B.

He was banned for 5 months in 2012 due to involvement in match-fixing scandal.

In January 2013 he was loaned to Nocerina.

In June 2013 he was banned 6 months due to suing the chairman of Livorno without authorization. In 2014 his contract with the club was terminated.

Monza
In January 2015 De Lucia was signed by Lega Pro struggler Monza.

Coaching career
Upon his retirement, in 2017 he was chosen as president of his hometown club Nola, which was promoted into Serie D at the end of his first season in charge. On 20 August 2021, he was hired by the club as its head coach. He resigned on 17 November 2021 after a series of poor results.

References

1983 births
Living people
People from Nola
Italian footballers
Italy youth international footballers
Association football goalkeepers
Parma Calcio 1913 players
U.S. Salernitana 1919 players
U.S. Livorno 1915 players
A.S.G. Nocerina players
A.C. Monza players
Serie A players
Serie B players
Serie C players
Italian football managers
Serie D managers
Footballers from Campania
Sportspeople from the Province of Naples